Maior Arcana: The Words That Turn Flesh into Light is a compilation album by the Polish symphonic black metal band Lux Occulta. It is actually a compilation of four new tracks, dubbed the Maior Arcana EP, which comprise the first four tracks of the disc, and the band's 1995 demo The Forgotten Arts, which comprises the final five tracks of the disc. As such, the compilation is often labeled as an EP, despite being in fact longer than the band's previous release, Dionysos.

"Love (Garden of Aphrodite)" is a reworked version of "Love". The titles of "War" and "Love" are mistakenly swapped on the track list, probably due to the songs being switched in running order from the demo. "Heart of the Devil" is a cover of a song by Danzig, and "Burn" is a cover of a song by The Sisters of Mercy with new lyrics.

Track listing
Love (Garden of Aphrodite) (6:45)
Heart of the Devil (3:19)
When Horned Souls Awake (3:47)
Burn (5:11)
Creation (6:26)
War (5:18)
Love (9:27)
Passing Away (4:49)
The Path (You've Found) (2:39)

1998 albums
Lux Occulta albums